Shannon Michael Frizell (born 11 February 1994) is a Tongan born New Zealand rugby union player who plays for  in the Bunnings NPC and the  in Super Rugby. His position of choice is flanker.

Early life
Frizell was born and raised in Folaha, Tonga and started his childhood playing football for Folaha Football Club. His adoptive brother, Tyson Frizell, plays in the National Rugby League. In 2010 and 2011 he played for the Tonga national under-17 football team. He represented the Tonga national under-17 football team at the 2011 OFC U-17 Championship in New Zealand.

Playing career

Early career

Senior career
His performances for the Highlanders earned him a call up for New Zealand's national rugby team, the All Blacks, having been tipped by the media for an unlikely All Black debut.

With injury to Vaea Fifita, Frizell made his debut for the All Blacks on 23 June 2018 against France. Frizell started the game at blindside flanker, playing 71 minutes on debut. Frizell had to be taken to the blood bin in the 22nd minute, due to an eye injury, so was temporarily replaced by Highlanders team mate Jackson Hemopo, who was also on debut for New Zealand. Frizell came back on in the 31st minute and stayed on for the rest of the test, which the All Blacks won 49-14.

Frizell went on to start three times for the All Blacks during the 2018 Rugby Championship, in the absence of the injured regular starter, Liam Squire. Frizell was one of the standout performers in the first test against Argentina, on 8 September, playing the full 80 minutes at his homeground in Nelson, scoring his first try for the All Blacks as they won 46-24. Frizell unfortunately failed to make an impact in the final two tests of the competition, including the 32-30 victory over South Africa, on 6 October. It was 6-6 at halftime, with Frizell subbed off 46 minutes into the test.

With Vaea Fifita recalled, Frizell was dropped for the All Blacks end of year tour in 2018. Rookies Gareth Evans, Dillon Hunt and Dalton Papalii were also chosen over Frizell.

After some strong performances in the 2019 Super Rugby season, where he was among the highest try scorers, with six tries, Frizell earned a recall for New Zealand's 39 man Rugby Championship squad.

In July 2019, Frizell and four other players, including Highlanders teammate, Josh Ioane, were dropped from the All Blacks, having performed poorly against South Africa in a 16-16 draw. Frizell was released to Tasman for the 2019 Mitre 10 Cup.

Luke Jacobson's concussion problems continued, which ruled him out of the 2019 Rugby World Cup, to Frizell's benefit. Frizell immediately flew to Japan after Jacobson's injury, to rejoin the 31 man All Blacks squad. He played 1 match off the bench versus South Africa and started against Canada and Namibia scoring a try in the Canada test.

Frizell was named in the South Island squad for the North vs South rugby union match in 2020, starting in the number 6 jersey in a 38-35 win for the South.

He continued his stay in the All Blacks, named in the squad for the 2020 Rugby Championship Frizell established himself as the first choice number 6 with starts against Australia in a 16-16 draw, a 27-7 win and a 5-43 win.

Frizell was one of the best players during the 2021 Super Rugby Aotearoa season and was again named in the All Blacks squad to play Tonga and Fiji in the July Steinlager Series.

International Tries 
As of 9 August 2022

Assault case
Frizell attacked a man and slapped and punched a woman during a late night incident on May 9, 2021. He also sent an abusive social media message to a friend of one of the victims. "F*** you b**** tell your friend to hide I'm gonna f*** everyone's up f*** with the wrong guy," it read. A conviction was not recorded after he pled guilty and completed Police diversion.

References

External links 
 

New Zealand rugby union players
1994 births
Living people
Tasman rugby union players
Highlanders (rugby union) players
Rugby union flankers
Rugby union locks
Rugby union number eights
New Zealand international rugby union players